86 Aquarii (abbreviated 86 Aqr) is a binary star system in the equatorial constellation of Aquarius. 86 Aquarii is the Flamsteed designation, though it also bears the Bayer designation c1 Aquarii. It is faint but visible to the naked eye with an apparent visual magnitude of +4.47.

The two components of this system have an angular separation of 0.25 arcseconds. The brighter component is a giant star with a spectral classification of G8 III and an apparent magnitude of 4.79. The effective temperature of its outer atmosphere is 4,900 K, giving it the yellowish glow of a G-type star. The fainter component is a star of magnitude 6.77.

References

External links
 Image 86 Aquarii

Aquarii, c1
Aquarii, 086
218240
Spectroscopic binaries
Aquarius (constellation)
114119
G-type giants
8789
CD-24 17497